Monty Anthony Stickles (August 16, 1938 – September 3, 2006) was an American football tight end in the National Football League (NFL) for the San Francisco 49ers and the New Orleans Saints.

Stickles was born in Kingston, New York on August 16, 1938 and grew up in Poughkeepsie, New York, the son of Frances and Montfort Stickles. After graduating from Poughkeepsie High School, Stickles played End (offensive) and kicked extra points for University of Notre Dame from 1957 to 1959, wearing number 80. He measured 6'4", 215 lbs. During that time, he was a three-year starter and a two-time first-team All-American, consensus in 1959. As a senior, he was 9th in Heisman voting. In 1957, he had 11 catches for 183 yards and three touchdowns. He also led the team in scoring with 11 extra points, one field goal, and three touchdowns for 32 points, made 27 tackles, and broke up two passes. In 1958, he led in minutes played and scored 60 points while making 31 tackles. He also led the team in receiving with 20 catches for 328 yards and seven touchdowns. While playing for Notre Dame he accumulated 42 career receptions for 746 yards and 12 touchdowns, kicked 42 extra points and five field goals, made 110 tackles, broke up six passes, recovered three fumbles, and blocked one kick. He also participated in the East-West Shrine the College All-Star games.

In 1960, he was the first-round-draft-pick of the San Francisco 49ers, who had the 11th pick in the first-round of the NFL draft that year. He also was chosen in the first round by the Los Angeles Chargers of the newly formed AFL in 1960.

Stickles played for the San Francisco 49ers from 1960 through 1967, wearing number 85.
After his professional football career was over, Stickles was a long-time sportscaster and sports talk radio host for KGO Radio in San Francisco.

Filmography

External links

1938 births
2006 deaths
All-American college football players
American football tight ends
California Golden Bears football announcers
College basketball announcers in the United States
College football announcers
National Football League announcers
New Orleans Saints players
Notre Dame Fighting Irish football players
Oakland Raiders announcers
People from San Francisco
Sportspeople from Kingston, New York
Sportspeople from Poughkeepsie, New York
Players of American football from New York (state)
San Francisco 49ers players
San Francisco Dons men's basketball announcers